The Autism Research Institute (ARI) is an organization that created a controversial program, Defeat Autism Now! (DAN!), in 1995. ARI was founded in 1967 by Bernard Rimland.

Defeat Autism Now! (DAN!) 

DAN! advocated for alternative treatments for autism and maintained a registry of doctors that were trained by the program to perform them. DAN! was one of the more prominent advocates for the now discredited belief that vaccines may be a cause of autism.  Its "highest rated" autism treatment was chelation therapy, which involves removing heavy metals from the body. Its chelation treatment was not supported by mainstream doctors. Doctors told the Chicago Tribune the treatments were dangerous and that misleading tests were used to show that those with autism had a high rate of heavy metals. According to the Chicago Tribune, metals occur naturally in the body and very little is known about what a normal range is. As of 2009, three-fourths of families with a child diagnosed with autism will try an alternative treatment like those that were prescribed by DAN!.

ARI's director said in 2011 that the organization's views on autism treatments had changed. The DAN! program and doctor registry was discontinued in January 2011, which was followed by the disbanding of the DAN! conference in 2012.

References 

Alternative medicine organizations
Mental health organizations in California
Autism-related organizations in the United States
Medical research institutes in California
Autism pseudoscience
Organizations established in 1967
1967 establishments in California